Dörnberg may refer to:

Places
Dörnberg, a municipality in the district of Rhein-Lahn, in Rhineland-Palatinate, in western Germany

People
Dörnberg is a noble family in Germany.
Alexander von Dörnberg (1901–1983), German jurist, diplomat and SS officer
Baroness Wilhelmine of Dörnberg (1803–1835), German baroness
Wilhelm von Dörnberg (1768–1850), German general
Ferdy Doernberg (born 1967), English-German musician
Stefan Doernberg (1924–2010), German writer and educator

Disambiguation pages with surname-holder lists
German-language surnames